Pedro Montemolín was a Roman Catholic prelate who served as Auxiliary Bishop of Osma (1487-1500) and Auxiliary Bishop of Seville from 1500 until an unknown date.

Biography
On 17 Dec 1487, Pedro Montemolín was appointed during the papacy of Pope Innocent VIII as Titular Bishop of Marocco o Marruecos and Auxiliary Bishop of Osma.  In 1500, he was appointed during the papacy of Pope Alexander VI as Auxiliary Bishop of Seville.

References

External links and additional sources
 (for Chronology of Bishops) 
 (for Chronology of Bishops) 

16th-century Roman Catholic bishops in Spain
Bishops appointed by Pope Innocent VIII
Bishops appointed by Pope Alexander VI